Jean Bréchignac (29 September 1914 – 25 May 1984) was a French Army officer who fought in World War II, First Indochina War and Algerian War. He led the 2nd Battalion, 1st Parachute Chasseur Regiment (1er RCP) in Indochina, most notable during the Battle of Dien Bien Phu, and the 9th Parachute Chasseur Regiment in Algeria. His career ended when he took part in the 1961 Algiers putsch against the French government. He was described as one of the most accomplished officers of his period by Jules Roy.

Biography
He was a graduate from Saint-Cyr Military Academy and fought in World War II. Bréchignac was given command of the 2nd Battalion of the 1st Parachute Chasseur Regiment (1er RCP), which arrived in Indochina on 17 January 1953, taking part in several airborne operations, most notable the Battle of Dien Bien Phu. He and most of his battalion jumped into Dien Bien Phu during the night of 3/4 April. Bréchignac was captured at the end of the battle; he was amongst the minority that survived Viet Minh captivity.

Bréchignac commanded the 9th Parachute Chasseur Regiment from 1959 to 1961. He took part in the 1961 Algiers putsch against the French government, when it failed he was sentenced to two years imprisonment with suspended death sentence on 26 June.

Decorations
Commander of the Légion d’honneur
Croix de guerre 1939–1945
Croix de guerre des Théatres d'Opérations Exterieures
Croix de la Valeur Militaire

He received thirteen citations during his career.

1914 births
1984 deaths
French Army personnel of World War II
French military personnel of the First Indochina War
French military personnel of the Algerian War
French Army officers
École Spéciale Militaire de Saint-Cyr alumni
Commandeurs of the Légion d'honneur
Recipients of the Croix de Guerre 1939–1945 (France)
Recipients of the Croix de guerre des théâtres d'opérations extérieures
Recipients of the Cross for Military Valour